In the finite element method for the numerical solution of elliptic partial differential equations, the stiffness matrix is a matrix that represents the system of linear equations that must be solved in order to ascertain an approximate solution to the differential equation.

The stiffness matrix for the Poisson problem
For simplicity, we will first consider the Poisson problem

One then approximates

The coefficients  are determined so that the error in the approximation is orthogonal to each basis function :

The stiffness matrix is the -element square matrix  defined by

By defining the vector  with components  the coefficients  are determined by the linear system . The stiffness matrix is symmetric, i.e. , so all its eigenvalues are real. Moreover, it is a strictly positive-definite matrix, so that the system  always has a unique solution. (For other problems, these nice properties will be lost.)

Note that the stiffness matrix will be different depending on the computational grid used for the domain and what type of finite element is used. For example, the stiffness matrix when piecewise quadratic finite elements are used will have more degrees of freedom than piecewise linear elements.

The stiffness matrix for other problems
Determining the stiffness matrix for other PDEs follows essentially the same procedure, but it can be complicated by the choice of boundary conditions. As a more complex example, consider the elliptic equation

where  is a positive-definite matrix defined for each point  in the domain. We impose  the Robin boundary condition

where  is the component of the unit outward normal vector  in the -th direction. The system to be solved is

as can be shown using an analogue of Green's identity. The coefficients  are still found by solving a system of linear equations, but the matrix representing the system is markedly different from that for the ordinary Poisson problem.

In general, to each scalar elliptic operator  of order , there is associated a bilinear form  on the Sobolev space , so that the weak formulation of the equation  is

Then the stiffness matrix for this problem is

Practical assembly of the stiffness matrix
In order to implement the finite element method on a computer, one must first choose a set of basis functions and then compute the integrals defining the stiffness matrix. Usually, the domain  is discretized by some form of mesh generation, wherein it is divided into non-overlapping triangles or quadrilaterals, which are generally referred to as elements. The basis functions are then chosen to be polynomials of some order within each element, and continuous across element boundaries. The simplest choices are piecewise linear for triangular elements and piecewise bilinear for rectangular elements.

The element stiffness matrix  for element  is the matrix

The full stiffness matrix  is the sum of the element stiffness matrices. In particular, for basis functions that are only supported locally, the stiffness matrix is sparse.

For many standard choices of basis functions, i.e. piecewise linear basis functions on triangles, there are simple formulas for the element stiffness matrices.

Then the element stiffness matrix is

When the differential equation is more complicated, say by having an inhomogeneous diffusion coefficient, the integral defining the element stiffness matrix can be evaluated by Gaussian quadrature.

The condition number of the stiffness matrix depends strongly on the quality of the numerical grid. In particular, triangles with small angles in the finite element mesh induce large eigenvalues of the stiffness matrix, degrading the solution quality.

References
 
 
 
 
 

Applied mathematics
Numerical analysis